Nikkola is a Finnish surname. Notable people with the surname include: 

Ari-Pekka Nikkola (born 1969), Finnish ski jumper
Iisakki Nikkola (1887–1959), Finnish farmer and politician

See also
Nikola

Finnish-language surnames